Kalateh-ye Hoseyn (also Romanized as Kalāteh-ye Ḩoseyn, Kalateh Hosein and Kalāteh Husain) is a village in Baqeran Rural District, in the Central District of Birjand County, South Khorasan Province, Iran. At the 2006 census, its population was 18, in 7 families.

References 

Populated places in Birjand County